Moses Roper ( – April 15, 1891) was an African American abolitionist, author and orator. He wrote an influential narrative of his enslavement in the United States in his Narrative of the Adventures and Escape of Moses Roper from American Slavery and gave thousands of lectures in Great Britain and Ireland to inform the European public about the brutality of American slavery.

Early life 
Roper was born around 1815 in Caswell County, North Carolina. He was born to a Southern planter, Henry Roper, who was also his enslaver; his mother, Nancy, was of African American and indigenous descent who was enslaved by Henry Roper. When his wife discovered that Henry had raped Nancy, she attempted to murder Nancy but was prevented from doing so by Nancy's mother. When Moses was seven years old, he was separated from his mother and both were not reunited for several years.  Roper was enslaved by several men in North Carolina and Florida, where after several attempts he successfully managed to escape enslavement. Roper later said he had tried to escape between 16 and 20 times and after each failed attempt, was tortured and abused at the hands of his enslaver. In his slave narrative, he described his method of escaping recapture in Georgia: he encountered a group of farmers who wrote a free pass for him:

I pretended to show her my passport, feeling for it everywhere about my coat and hat, and not finding it, I went back a little way, pretending to look for it, but came back, saying, I was very sorry, but I did not know where it was ... [the farmers offered to help and their] lad sat down and wrote what I told him, nearly filling a large sheet of paper for the passport, and another with recommendations.

Roper eventually reached New York and moved to Massachusetts and Vermont for short periods of time as he was fearful of being recognized by slave catchers who were active in the region. Due to his father being a white man, Roper could pass for being white and for his safety was urged by associates to join the U.S. Army to escape unwanted attention. However, with the help of American abolitionists, Roper instead boarded a ship destined for Great Britain and settled in London. There, he published his slave narrative, Narrative of the Adventures and Escape of Moses Roper from American Slavery; an influential narrative on the horrors of slavery first-hand, the book contained an account of Roper's enslavement and everything he had witnessed, as well as images of the torture he received while enslaved. According to Martha J. Cutter, the 1838 edition, which contained five illustrations, is one of the first illustrated slave narratives published by an enslaved African American. Cutter also contends that Roper's narrative "depicts forms of agency and subjectivity that move beyond the master's system of representation," layering "patterns of Christian symbolism that invoke martyrdom and even crucifixion onto and over a resistant and active enslaved body." The text therefore "performs a mode of Christian salvation that involves putting one's fate in the hands of God but one's feet in the position of running (away from, or out of, slavery)." The text's illustrations also "refigure formations of enslaved abasement common in abolitionist discourse through a type of liberation theology."

In the book, Roper makes reference to the brutality of one of his enslavers, Mr. Gooch:

My master gave me a hearty dinner, the best he ever did give me; but it was to keep me from dying before he had given me all the flogging he intended. After dinner he took me to a log-house, stripped me quite naked, fastened a rail up very high, tied my hands to the rail, fastened my feet together, put a rail between my feet, and stood on one end of it to hold me down; the two sons then gave me fifty lashes each, the son-in-law another fifty, and Mr. Gooch himself fifty more...This may appear incredible, but the marks which they left at present remain on my body, a standing testimony to the truth of this statement of his severity.

During his lectures in Great Britain and Ireland, Roper retold these stories and exhibited tools used in the torture, including whips, chains and manacles to highlight the brutality of American slavery. During a meeting in Sheffield in April 1838, he exhibited whips and a device nicknamed a “negro flapper” used to beat field slaves.

Activism in Britain and Ireland

Roper's patronage in England was carefully planned; he carried letters of introduction to Rev. Dr. Fletcher, Rev. Dr. Morison and Rev. Dr. Raffles, through whom he met other sympathetic patrons, notably Rev. Dr. T. Price and Rev. F. Cox, and leading British abolitionists such as Thomas Fowell Buxton. Denied the chance to learn to read and write while enslaved in the United States, Roper took the opportunity to learn how to do so in Hackney, Wallingford in Oxfordshire, and then entered the University of London:

At Hackney I remained half a year, going through the rudiments of an English education. At this time I attended the ministry of Dr Cox, which I enjoyed very much ... never, I trust, will be efaced from my memory, the parental care of the Rev. Dr Morison, from whom I can say, I received the greatest kindness.

His patrons then assisted him in his object of touring the country's chapels to spread knowledge of American slavery; and subscribed to, and helped promote his autobiography.

Roper toured the length and breadth of England, as well as several places in Ireland, Scotland and Wales, making the case for the abolition of slavery in the U.S.

In London, two of his first speeches were in May 1836. The first at the Rev. Thomas Price's Baptist Chapel, Devonshire Square, and the second at the independent Finsbury Chapel of Rev. Alexander Fletcher. Each attracted large crowds and were extensively reported, influencing British views on American slavery.

One newspaper correspondent described Roper's speech after a meeting in Bradford in 1840:

“He exhibited and described some implements of corporal punishment, used by the planters of the United States and their merciless overseers, and gave a melancholy detail of the sufferings to which the slaves are exposed, and the degraded condition to which the system of slavery has reduced the white population of the Southern States of America…Mr. Roper, in the course of his description of the eventful fortunes of his attempts to escape, roused the liveliest sympathy in the breasts of his hearers, and recited several soul-stirring strains of Montgomery’s (of Sheffield) poetry. He lamented in a feeling manner the fate of his mother, whom he had wished to redeem from slavery, but who is now dead. He enlarged on the desolate condition of his brothers and sisters who have been sold to remote states, and from whom he has had no intelligence of late. He stated that he still loved America, that he suffered much from the English climate, yet to be reckoned a British citizen had been his ardent desire, but that legal naturalization was above his pecuniary means.”

Throughout his tour, Roper challenged conventional perspectives on American slavery. During one speech in Leicester in 1838, he declared: "Many will say “This is the slaves’ side of the question. The slave-holders would tell a different story.” You have heard the slave-holders’ story 250 years ago. Now, I think it is time for the slaves to speak." By 1848, his slave narrative had sold over 38,000 copies, with over 5,000 in the Welsh language. He lectured over 2,000 times across Britain and Ireland in Baptist, Independent, Methodist and Quaker churches and town halls in nearly every county in Britain and was one of the few activists to lecture in the Scottish Highlands. The sheer extent of Roper’s lecturing tour is astounding, particularly when one considers his travels to rural communities in Cornwall and Wales. See the references for a map of his speaking locations.

Despite the positive feedback Roper received during his lecturing tours, his relationship with some of his abolitionist associates became strained. In Roper’s 1838 edition of his narrative, the Rev. Thomas Price had written a testimonial which bore “unequivocal witness to [Roper's] sobriety, intelligence, and honesty.” His “great ambition is to be qualified for usefulness amongst his own people; and the progress he has already made justifies the belief that if the means of education can be secured for a short time longer, he will be eminently qualified to instruct the children of Africa in the truths of the gospel of Christ.” However, two years later, Price openly criticized Roper for a “desultory and mendicant life.” His incessant “begging” was contrary to his “original and professed design of becoming a missionary” and Price demanded Roper remove his testimonial from the narrative. The debate raged on the pages of The Patriot newspaper in late 1840 with Price charging Roper with reneging on previous promises to become a missionary in Africa. Later editions of his narrative omitted Price's testimonial.

Roper also faced charges of falsehood during his lecturing tours by some who refused to believe his accounts of the brutality of American slavery. In 1836, Roper wrote to a local newspaper that a Reverend R. J. Breckinridge questioned “the accuracy of a statement made by me in reference to the burning alive of a slave in the United States.” Roper assured both Breckinridge and the newspaper editor that the story was true and proceeded to relate the “particulars of that melancholy event.” An enslaved man named George was chained to a tree, “the chain having been passed round his neck, arms, and legs, to make him secure.” A large amount “of tar and turpentine was then poured over his head […] and the miserable man perished in the flames.” Long after the lynching and as a warning to the local enslaved population, “not only was the stump of the tree to which the slave George had been fastened to be seen, but some of his burnt bones.” Roper wrote that he was “ready to attest in the most solemn” manner if necessary, and he stated that “though I have been a slave, I trust my evidence will be received on matters of fact which have come within the range of my own observation.” This would not be the last time that Roper was challenged on the veracity of his accounts, and his statements were frequently questioned by the press. Despite this, Roper refused to compromise on his graphic descriptions of violence faced by the enslaved and always resolved to "tell the truth" about his experiences.

For this reason, Roper preferred to lecture on his own: in a refutation of traditional abolitionist dynamics, one newspaper correspondent recorded that Roper "commenced by stating why he did not like having a chairman to preside at meetings at which he spoke. He came from America, which was a land of independence, and he wished to be independent, and avoid the risk of offending any body, which he perhaps might do by some of his observations. Sometimes he had found the chairman not disposed to go the full length with him in his views, and that threw a damp upon the proceedings. He then introduced himself as Moses Roper."

Family and life in the U.S.

Roper married Ann Stephen Price in Bristol, England, on December 21, 1839. He had four daughters: one born in the Atlantic on the way to Canada in about 1844, two born in Quebec and the youngest born in Nova Scotia between 1850 and 1857. He thrice returned to the United Kingdom: first in 1846 to "settle private matters" (possibly to arrange a new edition of his Narrative); then in 1854 and sometime before 1861, to lecture. The final time, he brought his wife and daughters back, and the 1861 British Census finds them living with his father-in-law (William Price) in Merthyr Tydfil, Glamorgan, Wales, while Roper is in Cambridge, England, staying in a boarding house.

Some time after 1861, Moses Roper returned to the U.S., where he became an itinerant lecturer, travelling around the country to lecture on various subjects, including "Africa and the African People", "Causes of the Colors of the Races" and on the "Holy Land". It appears that after his return to the U.S., his family never heard from him again; by 1871, his wife has remarried and when his youngest daughter Alice Mary Maud Roper married in 1883, Roper's name was listed with the comment "(deceased)."

Several years before his death, Roper wandered through New England taking whatever employment he could find; he was working as a field hand on the farm of James T. Skillings in Franklin County, Maine, near the town of Strong when "his strength gave out" in April 1891. Roper, in very poor physical condition with a little more than a hundred dollars in his pocket and accompanied only by a dog named Pete (described as "his faithful companion") was placed on a train to Boston, Massachusetts.

Roper and his dog made it to Boston, but he was found unconscious in a railroad station and taken to the Boston City Hospital. When he was found, it was noted that he was "well protected from the cold, wearing four shirts, two overcoats and three pair of pantaloons" and he was suffering from "a complication of diseases of the heart and kidneys and also from eczema" which eventually led to his death on April 15, 1891. His dog had to be dragged away from his bedside. Roper was buried in a pauper's grave in Boston, though his obituaries in the American press noted the importance of his abolitionist work in both the U.S and Europe.

See also
 Slave narrative

Notes

Further reading 
 Andrews, William L., North Carolina Slave Narratives: The Lives of Moses Roper, Lunsford Lane, Moses Grandy & Thomas H. Jones (Chapel Hill, University of North Carolina Press, 2003).
 Cutter, Martha J. "Revising Torture: Moses Roper and the Visual Rhetoric of the Slave's Body in the Transatlantic Abolition Movement". ESQ: A Journal of the American Renaissance 60.3 (2014) (No. 236 O.S.): 371–411.
 Cutter, Martha J. The Illustrated Slave Empathy, Graphic Narrative, and the Visual Culture of the Transatlantic Abolition Movement, 1800-1852 (University of Georgia Press, 2017)
 Murray, Hannah-Rose, “Monstrous Perversions and Lying Inventions: Moses Roper’s Performative Resistance to the Transatlantic Imagination of American Slavery," in Andrew Dix and Peter Templeton (eds.), Violence from Slavery to #BlackLivesMatter (London: Routledge, 2019). doi:10.4324/9780429342684.
 Murray, Hannah-Rose, Advocates of Freedom: African American Transatlantic Abolitionism in the British Isles (Cambridge: Cambridge University Press, 2020)
 Murray, Hannah-Rose, African American Abolitionist Website: Moses Roper's mapped speaking locations: www.frederickdouglassinbritain.com
 Sweeney, Fionnghuala; Baker, Bruce E. 'Moses Roper, The First Fugitive Save Lecturer in Ireland', IJAS 9 (2020): http://ijas.iaas.ie/issue-9-sweeney-baker/
 
 Taylor, Yuval, I was Born A Slave: An Anthology of Classic Slave Narratives: Vol 1 1770-1849 (Edinburgh: Payback Press, 1999).

External links
 A picture of Roper
 A short biography of Roper
 A Narrative of the Adventures and Escape of Moses Roper, from American Slavery. Philadelphia: Merrihew & Gunn, 1838.
 "Narrative of the Adventures and Escape of Moses Roper, from American Slavery. With an Appendix, Containing a List of Places Visited by the Author in Great Britain and Ireland and the British Isles; and Other Matter". Berwick-upon-Tweed: Published for the author and printed at the Warder Office, 1848.
 A Chronology of Roper's Life
 Roper's speeches in England
 Roper's marriage license
 1838 article from The Liberator on Roper, 30 March 1838.
 Moses Roper's mapped speaking locations in Britain and Ireland on Murray, Hannah-Rose, African American Abolitionist Website

1815 births
African-American writers
American people of English descent
19th-century American slaves
People from Caswell County, North Carolina
People who wrote slave narratives
1891 deaths